Namunaria is a genus of cylindrical bark beetles in the family Zopheridae, first described by Edmund Reitter in 1882. There are at least two described species in Namunaria.

Species
These two species belong to the genus Namunaria:
 Namunaria guttulata (LeConte, 1863)
 Namunaria pacifica (Horn, 1878)
BioLib lists 7 species and fails to include the two listed by GBIF:

 Namunaria australis (Grouvelle, 1893)
 Namunaria bhutanensis (Šlipinski, 1981)
 Namunaria chinensis Schuh, 1999
 Namunaria communis (Carter & Zeck, 1937)
 Namunaria mammillaris Schuh, 1999
 Namunaria picta (Sharp, 1885)
 Namunaria rufonotata (Carter & Zeck, 1937)

References

Further reading

 
 

Zopheridae
Articles created by Qbugbot
Taxa named by Edmund Reitter